Saprinus splendens is a species of clown beetles belonging to the family Histeridae.

Description
Females are longer than males. They are very variable in size, punctation and color. Body is oval, weakly convex and shiny. Pronotum is yellowish-green, while elytra may be shiny dark blue or bottle green or reddish. Elytra show three-four external dorsal striae and a punctation quite variable in density, area and size.

Distribution
This species is widely distributed. It is present from the Republic of South Africa through tropical Africa, Arabia, Kashmir, Afghanistan, Pakistan, most of the Oriental Region and Japan. It has been introduced in Australia from South Africa. It is present in the Northern Territory, Queensland, South and Western Australia.

References

Histeridae
Beetles described in 1811